Parichay  is an Indo-Canadian singer, composer, and music producer. He has released four albums and collaborated in Bollywood film songs.

Career
Parichay collaborated in a remix of Yamla Pagla Deewana and "O Meri Chandni" from the film Chaar Din Ki Chandni which he sang with Sunidhi Chauhan. In 2016, he composed 4 out of 5 songs for the Bollywood film Loveshhuda.. He also sang 3 of them along with Vishal Dadlani, Neha Kakkar and Teesha Nigam. In June 2017, he released a new single titled 'Habitaan Vigaad Di' which features Bollywood actress Nargis Fakhri & Canadian rapper, Kardinal Offishall. Nargis, made her singing debut with this song. Next, he released a single titled 'Saare Mundeya Nu' which features international pop/ urban artist, Sean Kingston. Parichay also collaborated with Rapper, Fazilpuria, known for his hit song "Kar Gayi Chull" on their single titled "Let's Get The Party Started" 

Parichay has also collaborated with actress Sonakshi Sinha on the remake of the classic Bollywood song Tum Mile Dil Khile. Another version of this song was also released and sung by Parichay himself along with singer Jonita Gandhi and features British Asian model & actress Sangeet Samra in the music video.

Parichay's released a Desi Hip Hop track titled 'Champion' which features rappers Pardhaan, Raga, Haji Springer & Ace aka Mumbai. In addition to singing the hook, Parichay has composed and produced the music for this song. It was released by Sony Music India on Feb 28, 2020.

In 2021, Parichay released his 4th studio album titled "Moodz". The album has 10 songs and features Jonita Gandhi, Happy Singh and Haji Springer.

Discography

Albums

 No Boundaries (2009)
 All New Everything (2012)
 4 Steps Forward (2014)
 Moodz (2021)

Bollywood discography
Parichay's Bollywood discography is listed below.

Singles

References

External links
 

Bollywood playback singers
Indian male singers
Musicians from Toronto
Canadian people of Indian descent